1987 Grand Prix may refer to:

 1987 Grand Prix (snooker)
 1987 Grand Prix (tennis)